The women's long jump event at the 1990 World Junior Championships in Athletics was held in Plovdiv, Bulgaria, at Deveti Septemvri Stadium on 10 and 11 August.

Medalists

Results

Final
11 August

Qualifications
10 Aug

Group A

Group B

Participation
According to an unofficial count, 22 athletes from 19 countries participated in the event.

References

Long jump
Long jump at the World Athletics U20 Championships